Aspremont is a commune in the Alpes-Maritimes department in the Provence-Alpes-Côte d'Azur region of south-eastern France.

The inhabitants of the commune are known as Aspremontois or Aspremontoises.

Geography
Aspremont is located some 10 km north of Nice and 5 km east of Carros. Access to the commune is by road M414 (Route de Nice) from Nice in the south, by the M14 road from Saint-Blaise in the north, and by the M719 from Tourrette-Levens in the east. Apart from the village there are the towns of Les Salettes, La Plaine, La Valliere, and La Prairie near the village and Les Templiers, Bassac, Cabanes Bletonnieres, and Gibeste in the south. The commune is rugged and heavily forested in the west and east.

The Magnan river rises near the village and flows south through the heart of the commune then to the Mediterranean Sea in the south-west of Nice.

Aspremont is one of sixteen villages grouped together by the Métropole Nice Côte d'Azur tourist department as the Route des Villages Perchés (Route of Perched Villages). The others are: Carros, Castagniers, Coaraze, Colomars, Duranus, Èze, Falicon, La Gaude, Lantosque, Levens, La Roquette-sur-Var, Saint-Blaise, Saint-Jeannet, Tourrette-Levens and Utelle.

Neighbouring communes and villages

History
After the abandonment of the Aspremont-le-Vieux site in 1426, a fortified village was built in concentric circles at the foot of Mont-Chauve on a hill overlooking a path between the Var and the Paillon de Tourrette Valley. Soil and sunshine favoured the cultivation of vines, olives, and fruit trees, particularly fig trees. There was production of wine and olive oil in the county until the end of the 19th century.

In 1874 Aspremont had its land area divided to create the new communes of Colomars and Castagniers.

Heraldry

Administration

List of Successive Mayors

Population

Sites and monuments

Fort of Mont Chauve of Aspremont (19th century)
Ruins of the medieval village on Mont Cima
The house where François-Xavier Maistre was born
Church of Saint-Jacques le Mejeur
Chapel of Saint-Claude
Chapel of Notre-Dame des Salettes

Notable people linked to the commune
François-Xavier Maistre (1705-1789), President of the Senate of Savoy, father of Joseph de Maistre and Xavier de Maistre, was a native of Aspremont in the County of Nice.
Magma, a musical group, has had a recording studio in the commune since 2010.

Twin towns
 Montechiaro d'Acqui, Italy (2003)

See also
Communes of the Alpes-Maritimes department

References

External links

Aspremont commune website 
Aspremont on the old IGN website 
Aspremont on Géoportail, National Geographic Institute (IGN) website 
Aspremont on the 1750 Cassini Map

Communes of Alpes-Maritimes